Philautus ingeri is a species of frog in the family Rhacophoridae. It is endemic to northern Borneo and found in Sabah, Sarawak (East Malaysia), Brunei, and adjacent northern Kalimantan (Indonesia). Common names Inger's bush frog and Inger's bubble-nest frog have been coined for it. It is named for Robert F. Inger, American zoologist from the Field Museum of Natural History.

Description
The head is slightly longer than it is wide. The snout is depressed, elliptical in dorsal view and pointed and projecting in lateral view. The canthus is angular and nearly straight. The tympanum is distinct. The finger and toe tips have broad, oval discs. The fingers show distinct web rudiments, whereas the toes have partial webbing. The dorsum is brown. There is a dark triangle between the eyes, joined to a lyre-shaped mid-dorsal dark marking- The limbs have cross-bars. There is a broad black canthal stripe widening to eye, a dark blotch below eye, and a dark line below supratympanic ridge. The iris is gold in its upper third and dark brown elsewhere.

The male advertisement call is a series of five notes.

Habitat and conservation
It is nocturnal. Reproduction is presumed to be direct (that is, eggs hatching to froglets, without free-living tadpole stage).

The habitat of this species is fragmented and threatened by clear-cutting. However, it occurs in the Gunung Mulu National Park and Kinabalu National Park.

References

ingeri
Endemic fauna of Borneo
Amphibians of Brunei
Amphibians of Indonesia
Amphibians of Malaysia
Amphibians described in 1987
Taxonomy articles created by Polbot
Amphibians of Borneo